Somos may refer to:

Geography 
 Somoș River (Belinul Mic), in Covasna County, Romania
 Somoș River (Malnaș), in Covasna County, Romania
 Somoș River (Olt), in Covasna County, Romania

People 
Michael Somos, mathematician
Somos sequence

Companies 
Somos, Inc., a company that manages registry databases for the telecommunications industry

Music 
Somos (band)
Somos, the Spanish edition of the album Noi by Eros Ramazzotti
Somos (Christopher Von Uckermann album)
"Somos", tune written by Mario Clavell from El Último Trago, earlier recorded by António Machin 1959
Somos One Voice, an October 2017 telethon carried by NBC networks and organized and hosted by Jennifer Lopez for disaster relief in Puerto Rico following Hurricane Maria. It featured musicical performances by Lopez, J Velvet, Mary J. Blige with Chris Martin, Demi Lovato, Ricky Martin, Gwen Stefani, Stevie Wonder, Marc Anthony, and others.

Political parties
 Somos (political party), Argentine feminist party

Television 
Somos. a 2021 limited series on Netflix about the 2011 Los Zetas massacre in Allende, Coahuila in Mexico

Publications 
 Somos, an underground magazine published by the Frente de Liberación Homosexual from 1973 to 1976

Mathematics 
 Somos sequence
 Somos' quadratic recurrence constant

See also 
 Somo (disambiguation)